Carlos Berlocq was the defending champion but decided not to participate.
Andrey Kuznetsov won the title, after Paolo Lorenzi retired after trailing 3–6, 0–2 in the final.

Seeds

Draw

Finals

Top half

Bottom half

References
 Main Draw
 Qualifying Draw

Blu-express.com Tennis Cup - Singles
2012 - Singles